Great Woolstone and Little Woolstone are two historic villages in modern Milton Keynes, Buckinghamshire that are now called jointly Woolstone or The Woolstones and form the heart of a new district of that name, in the Campbell Park civil parish. At the 2011 Census, the population of the district was included in the figure for the civil parish and not reported separately.

History
The name 'Woolstone' is an Old English language word, and means 'Wulfsige's farm'.  In the Domesday Book of 1086, Great Woolstone was recorded as Ulsiestone. and Little Woolstone as Wlsiestone. Little Woolstone was enclosed by Act of Parliament in 1791, and Great Woolstone in 1796.

Until shortly after the turn of the 19th century, Little Woolstone was named Parva Woolstone. The area is now collectively known simply as "Woolstone" or "The Woolstones". The land between the two villages is now occupied by the village cricket green. 

They are both linear villages, being hemmed in by and along the north–south line of both the River Ouzel (to the east of the villages) and of the Grand Union Canal to the west.  They form part of a chain of three villages along this line, the next about a mile further south being Woughton-on-the-Green.

The Woolstones today
Today, Great Woolstone still has its own village pub, the thatched-roof "Cross Keys", which can trace its history back to 1560. Little Woolstone is the larger of the two Woolstones, having benefited from the building of the canal. Its village pub, "The Barge Inn", dates from this time, being opened to meet the needs of the canal labourers, but is now mainly a restaurant. The Church of England parish church of the Holy Trinity in Little Woolstone now serves both villages; the church in Great Woolstone closed in the 1970s and has served various purposes since then including being used as a music rehearsal room.

The old village centre seems only a little changed from its description in Buckinghamshire Footpaths in 1949:

People
Dorothy Wyndlow Pattison ("Sister Dora") was village schoolmistress in the parish of Little Woolston for three years from 1861; Pattison Lane, the main road through Woolstone, is named after her.

References

External links

Villages in Buckinghamshire
Areas of Milton Keynes